Yuli Paola Muñoz Carvajal (born 18 March 1989) is a Colombian footballer who played as a defender for the Colombia women's national football team. She was part of the team at the 2011 FIFA Women's World Cup. At the club level, she played for Club Deportivo Estudiantes F.C. in Colombia.

References

External links
 

1989 births
Living people
Women's association football defenders
Colombian women's footballers
Place of birth missing (living people)
Colombia women's international footballers
2011 FIFA Women's World Cup players
21st-century Colombian women